In theoretical physics, scalar electrodynamics is a theory of a U(1) gauge field coupled to a charged spin 0 scalar field that takes the place of the Dirac fermions in "ordinary" quantum electrodynamics. The scalar field is charged, and with an appropriate potential, it has the capacity to break the gauge symmetry via the Abelian Higgs mechanism.

Matter content and Lagrangian

Matter content 
The model consists of a complex scalar field  minimally coupled to a gauge field . 

The theory can also be defined for curved spacetime but these definitions must be replaced with a more subtle one. The gauge field is also known as a principal connection, specifically a principal  connection.

Lagrangian 
The dynamics is given by the Lagrangian density

where 
  is the electromagnetic field strength, or  curvature of the connection.
  is the covariant derivative of the field 
  is the electric charge 
  is the potential for the complex scalar field.

Gauge-invariance 

This is a real-valued function

Differential-geometric view 

From the geometric viewpoint,  is an infinitesimal change of trivialization, which generates the finite change of trivialization  In physics, it is customary to work under an implicit choice of trivialization, hence a gauge transformation really can be viewed as a change of trivialization.

Higgs mechanism 

As shown in 1973 by Nielsen and Olesen, this model, in  dimensions, admits time-independent finite energy configurations corresponding to vortices carrying magnetic flux. The magnetic flux carried by these vortices are quantized (in units of ) and appears as a topological charge associated with the topological current

These vortices are similar to the vortices appearing in type-II superconductors. This analogy was used by Nielsen and Olesen in obtaining their solutions.

Example 

A simple choice of potential for demonstrating the Higgs mechanism is 

This produces a circle of minima, with values , for  a real number.

Scalar chromodynamics 

This theory can be generalized from a theory with  gauge symmetry containing a scalar field  valued in  coupled to a gauge field  to a theory with gauge symmetry under the gauge group , a Lie group. 

The scalar field  is valued in a representation space of the gauge group , making it a vector; the label of scalar field refers only to the transformation of  under the action of the Lorentz group, so it is still referred to as a scalar field. The gauge-field is a -valued 1-form, where  is the Lie algebra of G.

References 

 

 Peskin, M and Schroeder, D. ;An Introduction to Quantum Field Theory (Westview Press, 1995) 

Quantum electrodynamics